The Pirates! In an Adventure with Scientists! (released in North America, Australia and New Zealand as The Pirates! Band of Misfits) is a 2012 3D stop-motion animated swashbuckler comedy film produced by the British studio Aardman Animations and the American studio Sony Pictures Animation as their second and final collaborative project. Directed by Peter Lord, the film is based on the 2004 novel The Pirates! In an Adventure with Scientists, the first book from Gideon Defoe's The Pirates! series. It follows a crew of amateur pirates in their attempt to win the Pirate of the Year competition.

The film was distributed by Columbia Pictures and was released on 28 March 2012 in the United Kingdom, and on 27 April 2012 in the United States. The Pirates! features the voices of Hugh Grant, Martin Freeman, Imelda Staunton, David Tennant, Jeremy Piven, Salma Hayek, Lenny Henry and Brian Blessed. The Pirates! is the fifth feature film by Aardman Animations, and its first stop-motion animated feature since Wallace & Gromit: The Curse of the Were-Rabbit in 2005, and Aardman's first stop-motion animated film released in 3D and shot in 2.35:1 widescreen. The film also served as the first stop-motion feature film released by Sony Pictures Entertainment. The film received generally positive reviews, and was a modest box office success, earning $123 million against a budget as high as $55 million. The film was nominated for the 2013 Academy Award for Best Animated Feature, but lost to Pixar's Brave. It was the second film from Sony Pictures Animation to be nominated after Surf's Up.

Plot
In London, 1837, Queen Victoria is told by her servants that England rules the entire ocean, with the exception of pirates, whom she despises. Meanwhile, The Pirate Captain leads an unorthodox group of amateur pirates who are trying to make a name for themselves on the high seas. To prove his worth, The Captain enters the annual Pirate of the Year competition, with the winner being whoever can plunder the most treasure. After several failed attempts to plunder mundane ships, they come across the HMS Beagle and capture its lone passenger, Charles Darwin, who recognizes the crew's pet "parrot", Polly, as the last living dodo bird. Darwin recommends that they enter Polly in the Scientist of the Year competition at the Royal Society of London, and The Captain accepts, believing that winning the competition can help him win the Pirate of the Year award, despite his assistant, The Pirate with the scarf, advising him not to. Allowing The Pirate Captain and his crew to stay at his house for the night, Darwin plans to steal Polly for himself in order to impress Queen Victoria, whom he's smitten with. He has his trained chimpanzee Mr. Bobo steal Polly in a mysterious disguise, but the pirates give chase, which leads to Darwin's house being destroyed.

The next day, the pirates disguise themselves as scientists to enter the competition, and the dodo display wins the top prize, which turns out to be a meeting with the Queen. The Queen requests that Polly be put in her petting zoo, but The Captain refuses and accidentally reveals his true identity. The Queen orders to have him executed, but Darwin intervenes, reminding the Queen that Polly has been hidden and only the Captain knows where. The Queen pardons the Captain of his crimes and orders Darwin to find Polly by any means necessary. Darwin and Mr. Bobo take the Captain to a tavern, get him intoxicated, and steal Polly, but The Captain chases them into the Tower of London, where the Queen is waiting. She gets rid of Darwin and Mr. Bobo for their incompetence via a trapdoor which leads to a dumpster, and offers The Captain enough treasure to ensure his win as Pirate of the Year in exchange for Polly. He accepts the offer and returns to his crew, telling them that he stole the treasure and assuring them Polly is still safe. 

At the Pirate of the Year ceremony, the Captain is announced as the winner, but rival pirate Black Bellamy finds a newspaper revealing the Queen's pardon and explains that if pardoned, one is no longer a pirate, and cannot be Pirate of the Year. The Captain is stripped of his treasure and pirate attire and admits to his crew that he sold Polly to the Queen for the treasure, prompting them to abandon him. The Captain returns to London and reunites with Darwin, who, while in the dumpster, found a brochure advertising a dining society of world leaders that feast on Endangered creatures, and Polly is to be served at their next banquet. Realizing that the Queen's a part of the society, The Captain and Darwin work together to steal an airship and find the Queen's flagship, the QV1, while Mr. Bobo sets off to retrieve the disbanded crew members.

Aboard the QV1, The Captain and Darwin find Polly before she's cooked and eaten, but the Queen finds them and attempts to kill both of them. Mr. Bobo and the crew come to their aid, but while fighting the Queen, they accidentally mix the ship's stash of baking soda with vinegar, causing a violent reaction that explodes and breaks the ship in two. The Queen tries to escape with Polly in the airship that the Captain and Darwin came on. Polly causes her to rip a hole in the airship and drop Polly, and the Captain catches her before she falls into the ship's propeller. The Captain, along with Darwin, Mr. Bobo and the rest of his crew, escape safely, leaving the furious Queen behind on her deflating airship. Due to their actions, the Captain was targeted with the highest bounty known to pirates, with 100,000 Doubloons placed by the Queen, restoring his pirate reputation as well as marking him as the most dangerous pirate alive. Darwin stays on an island to study more exotic animals, and The Pirate Captain continues his exploits with his crew, now joined by Mr. Bobo.

Voice cast

Production
Unlike Aardman's Flushed Away, which was computer animated in the style of claymation, Aardman extensively used computer graphics to complement and enrich the primarily stop-motion film with visual elements such as sea and scenery.

Peter Lord commented, "With Pirates!, I must say that the new technology has made Pirates! really liberating to make, easy to make because the fact that you can shoot a lot of green screen stuff, the fact that you can easily extend the sets with CGI, the fact that you can put the sea in there and a beautiful wooden boat that, frankly, would never sail in a million years, you can take that and put it into a beautiful CGI scene and believe it."

Naming
For the release in the United States, the film was retitled The Pirates! Band of Misfits, as Defoe's books do not have "the same following outside of the United Kingdom", so it was not necessary to keep the original title.

Hugh Grant, the voice of The Pirate Captain, said that the studio "didn't think the Americans would like the longer title". Response from the director of the film, Peter Lord, was that "some people reckoned the United Kingdom title wouldn't charm / amuse / work in the United States. Tricky to prove eh?"

Quentin Cooper of the BBC analysed the change of the title and listed several theories. One of them is that the British audience is more tolerant for the eccentricity of the British animators. Another is that the film makers did not want to challenge the United States viewers who do not accept the theory of evolution. He quoted science writer Jennifer Ouellette's 2010 statement at the Science & Entertainment Exchange that scientists are undesirable in American popular culture, being represented as "the mad scientist or the dweeby nerd that dress funny, have no social skills, play video games, long for unattainable women".

Controversy
In January 2012, it was reported that the latest trailer of The Pirates! attracted some very negative reactions from the "leprosy community". In the trailer that was released in December 2011, The Pirate Captain lands on a ship demanding gold, but is told by a crew member, "Gold? Afraid we don't have any gold, old man. This is a leper boat!" His left arm then falls off, and he says "See?"

Lepra Health in Action and some officials from the World Health Organization claimed that the joke depicted leprosy in a derogatory manner, and it "reinforces the misconceptions which leads to stigma and discrimination that prevents people from coming forward for treatment". They demanded an apology and removal of the offending scene, to which Aardman responded: "After reviewing the matter, we decided to change the scene out of respect and sensitivity for those who suffer from leprosy. The last thing anyone intended was to offend anyone..."

LHA responded that it was "genuinely delighted that Aardman has decided to amend the film", while the trailer was expected to be pulled down from websites, and the final version of the film changes the line in question to "Gold? This is a plague boat, old man! I'd give my right arm for some gold!" and when his left arm falls off, he adds "Or my left!"

Music

The film's score was composed by Theodore Shapiro who made his animated feature score debut with this film. The score was released digitally by Madison Gate Records on 24 April 2012, and as a CD-R on-demand on 17 May 2012. The film also includes a number of previously released songs by various artists, including "Swords of a Thousand Men" by Tenpole Tudor, "Ranking Full-Stop" by The Beat, "Fiesta" by The Pogues, "London Calling" by The Clash, "You Can Get It If You Really Want" by Jimmy Cliff, "Alright" by Supergrass, and "I'm Not Crying" by Flight of the Conchords.

Release

Home media
The Pirates! was released on DVD, Blu-ray, and Blu-ray 3D on 28 August 2012 in the United States, and on 10 September 2012 in the United Kingdom. The film is accompanied with an 18-minute short stop motion animated film called So You Want to Be a Pirate!, where The Pirate Captain hosts his own talk show about being a true pirate.

The short was also released on DVD on 13 August 2012, exclusively at Tesco stores in the United Kingdom. As a promotion for the release of The Pirates!, Sony attached to every DVD and Blu-ray a code to download a LittleBigPlanet 2 minipack of Sackboy clothing that represents 3 of the characters: The Pirate Captain, Cutlass Liz and Black Bellamy.

Reception

Box office
The film has grossed $123,054,041 worldwide. $26 million came from United Kingdom, $31 million from the United States and Canada, along with around $92 million from other territories, including the United Kingdom. As of 2017, it is the fourth highest-grossing stop-motion animated film of all time.

In North America, it ranked fifth on its opening day, taking in $2,749,959, slightly higher than Arthur Christmas’ $2.4 million opening day. The film eventually made $11.1 million on its opening weekend and reaching second at the box office behind Think Like a Man while averaging $3,315 through its 3,358 theatre’s, on its second weekend, it dropped by 50.6%, ranking fourth with $5,502,482, then to seventh place with $3,143,442, dropping by 42.9%.

In the United Kingdom, it opened to third with $3,486,095 behind The Hunger Games and Wrath of the Titans, averaging $6,443 through its 554 cinemas, it saw a 1.3% decline on its second weekend with $3,486,280, averaging $6,240 per cinema, and bringing the UK gross to $12,251,022.

Critical response
The website's consensus reads, "It may not quite scale Aardman's customary delirious heights, but The Pirates! still represents some of the smartest, most skillfully animated fare that modern cinema has to offer." Metacritic, which assigns a weighted average score out of 100 to reviews from mainstream critics, gives the film a score of 73 based on 31 reviews, indicating "generally favourable reviews".

Accolades

Cancelled sequel
By August 2011, Aardman had been already working on a sequel idea, and by June 2012, a story had been prepared, awaiting Sony to back the project. Eventually, Sony decided not to support the project due to insufficient international earnings. According to Lord, "it got close, but not quite close enough. I was all fired up for doing more. It was such fun to do! We actually have a poster for The Pirates! In an Adventure with Cowboys!. That would have been just great."

References

External links

 – official site (US)

2012 films
2012 3D films
2012 animated films
2012 action comedy films
2010s adventure comedy films
2010s American animated films
2010s children's comedy films
2010s historical comedy films
Aardman Animations films
American 3D films
American action adventure films
American action comedy films
American adventure comedy films
American children's animated action films
American children's animated adventure films
American children's animated comedy films
American children's animated fantasy films
American fantasy adventure films
Advertising and marketing controversies in film
Animation based on real people
Film controversies
Film controversies in the United Kingdom
British 3D films
British adventure comedy films
British children's adventure films
British children's animated films
British children's comedy films
British children's fantasy films
British fantasy adventure films
British historical comedy films
Clay animation films
Cultural depictions of Charles Darwin
Cultural depictions of Queen Victoria on film
Films set in 1837
Films set in London
Pirate films
British swashbuckler films
American swashbuckler films
2010s stop-motion animated films
Columbia Pictures animated films
Columbia Pictures films
Sony Pictures Animation films
Films directed by Peter Lord
Films scored by Theodore Shapiro
3D animated films
2012 directorial debut films
The Pirates!
2010s English-language films
2010s British films